NBU-prisen is a prize which is awarded by the Norwegian Writers for Children to a person or institution who had produced award-winning work in children's or youth literature in Norway. It is awarded every year to a Norwegian author or organization. The actual prize is a work of art, typically created by an illustrator of children’s books.

Prize winners 
1988: Anne-Marie Hole Borgen
1989: Norsk Forfattersentrum
1990: Literature Project in Telemark
1991: Else Ditlevsen
1992: Wenche Blomberg
1993: Kåre Kverndokken
1994: Director Karin Beate Vold (Norsk Barnebokinstitutt, the Norwegian Institute for Children’s Books)
1995: Hå Municipality
1996: Children's book editors Guri Vesaas (Samlaget) and Øyunn Krokann (of Gyldendal Tiden)
1997: Leikny Haga Indergaard
1988: Harald Bache-Wiig (University of Oslo)
1999: Barnetimen for de minste (NRK)
2000: Bookseller Lars-Erik Hanssen (of Fortuna Bokhandel)
2001: Author Anette Diesen
2002: Editor Irja Thorenfeldt (Aschehoug) and professor Åsfrid Svensen (of University of Oslo)
2003: Bookseller Kari Johanne Samuelsen and reviewer Ola By Rise (of Adresseavisen)
2004: Cultural editors at Hamar Arbeiderblad and Oppland Arbeiderblad for their book reviews
2005: Children's book editor Wenche Larsen (of Cappelen) and Anne Horn (of Omnipax)
2006: Children's librarian at Norwegian Library of Talking Books and Braille, Eli Frisvold and NRK's children's and youth editor
2007: School librarians Øystein Norvoll of Tromsø and Sigrunn Instefjord of Odda
2008: Jean-Baptiste Coursaud and Gabriele Haefs
2009: Former editor at Cappelen, Tori Hofmo, and editor at Cappelen Damm, Ellen Seip
2010: Pegasus, children's program at the Norwegian Literature Festival in Lillehammer
2011: Barnebokkritikk.no – the webpage specialises in reviewing and reporting on literature and performing arts for children and youth
2012: Falturiltu, Nynorsk book festival for children and youth
2013: Foreningen !les – the leading provider of literature for children and adolescents in Norway
2014: Children's book editor Marianne Koch Knudsen (Gyldendal)
2015: Writing studies in children’s and young adult literature at Norsk Barnebokinstitutt (NBI) and Dag Larsen
2016: Ubok.no
2017: 
2018: Arne Svingen
2019: Spangereid school library

References

External links

NBU - Norske Barne- og Ungdomsbokforfattere web page

Norwegian literary awards
Children's literary awards